Dick's Sporting Goods Park, also known as DSG Park, is a soccer-specific stadium located in Commerce City, Colorado that is home to the Colorado Rapids men's professional soccer team. The stadium seats up to 18,061 people for soccer matches, but can accommodate up to 19,734 for special soccer events and 27,000 for concerts. It became the third home venue for the Rapids upon its opening in 2007.

History

For their first eleven seasons, the Rapids played at Mile High Stadium (1996–2000) and Invesco Field at Mile High (2001–2006). In 2004, the club and city announced a $130 million project that would include youth soccer fields, retail development, and a new Commerce City civic center. The total cost of stadium construction was $64.5 million.  Commerce City voters agreed to $65 million bond for infrastructure improvements to support the stadium.  Construction began at the site, close to Denver's former Stapleton International Airport and bordered on the north and east by the Rocky Mountain Arsenal National Wildlife Refuge, to the south by 56th Avenue, and to the west by Quebec Street, in fall 2005. In November 2006, Dick's Sporting Goods signed a 20-year deal for naming rights.

The stadium opened with an intrasquad scrimmage open only to Commerce City residents and season ticket holders. The first official match was played against D.C. United on April 7, 2007, with the Rapids winning, 2–1. Herculez Gomez scored the first goal at the stadium. In the stadium's inaugural year, it hosted the 2007 MLS All-Star Game as the MLS All-Stars defeated Scotland's Celtic FC.

The Rapids played their first playoff game at DSG Park on October 28, 2010; a 1–0 victory over the Columbus Crew. Two weeks later, a crowd of 17,779 was in attendance as the Rapids defeated the San Jose Earthquakes en route to their first-ever MLS Cup.

The stadium is owned by Commerce City and operated by Kroenke Sports & Entertainment (KSE) who also own the Colorado Avalanche, Denver Nuggets, and the Colorado Mammoth, and English Premier League club Arsenal F.C. via subsidiary. The estimated cost of this project was $131 million, with investment shared equally between the city and KSE.

International soccer matches

Men's matches

Women's matches

Other sports events
The stadium has hosted several high-profile rugby games. In 2009, it hosted several matches of the 2009 Churchill Cup, including the United States v. Georgia, Canada v. Argentina, and England v. Ireland. The Denver Barbarians of Rugby Super League have hosted occasional home matches at the stadium.
In May 2009, the stadium hosted the Men's Collegiate Lacrosse Association National Championships with the Michigan Wolverines defeating Chapman University 12–11 in overtime on the Division I side and University of St. Thomas beating the University of Dayton 16–11 in Division II.

The Denver Dream of the Lingerie Football League played their two home games at the stadium during their lone season.

The stadium held the 2014 World Lacrosse Championship during July 10–19, 2014.

On Friday, March 22, 2013, Dick's Sporting Goods Park was the site of the World Cup CONCACAF 2014 qualifying match between Costa Rica and USA, a game played in blizzard conditions. Costa Rica filed a protest with FIFA due to field conditions when the United States won the game 1–0, but the protest was denied.  The game has already been dubbed in football lore as "SnowClásico" for the conditions.

Music events
The venue grounds hosted the Mile High Music Festival annually from 2008 to 2010. The first Mile High Music Festival had attendance of approximately 40,000 people each day over the course of two days. By utilizing the open soccer fields surrounding the stadium and additional stages throughout the complex, the complex's total capacity was able to greatly exceed what the stadium could hold alone.

The rock band Phish established an annual three-night residency at the venue over Labor Day Weekend, starting in 2011 and returning each year since (with the exception of 2020, due to the COVID-19 pandemic). In 2022, the residency expanded to four nights. Phish's lead singer, Trey Anastasio, noted "We all love Dicks!"

References

External links

 
 Dick’s Sporting Goods Park at StadiumDB.com

Colorado Rapids stadiums
Major League Soccer stadiums
Music venues in Colorado
Rugby union stadiums in Denver
Soccer venues in Colorado
Commerce City, Colorado
Buildings and structures in Adams County, Colorado
Tourist attractions in Adams County, Colorado
Sports venues completed in 2007
2007 establishments in Colorado
Lacrosse venues in the United States
Premier Lacrosse League venues
Kroenke Sports & Entertainment
Sports complexes in the United States